Henry James Hill (8 April 1851 – 7 May 1905) was an English first-class cricketer.

Hill was born at Edmonton in April 1851. He later played first-class cricket for the Marylebone Cricket Club, making four appearances. He made two appearances in 1880 against Lancashire and Hampshire, followed by an appearance each against Cambridge University in 1882 and Derbyshire in 1883. He had little success in these four matches, scoring 31 runs with a highest score of 17. Hill died at Bayswater in May 1905.

References

External links

1851 births
1905 deaths
People from Edmonton, London
English cricketers
Marylebone Cricket Club cricketers